Speeding Time is an album by American singer-songwriter Carole King, released in 1983.  King's 13th album in 14 years, Speeding Time was poorly reviewed and was her first album not to chart.  Following the album's release, King did not record again for six years.

Track listing
Side 1
 "Computer Eyes" (King, Gerry Goffin) – (3:08)
 "One Small Voice" (King) – (3:01)
 "Crying in the Rain" (King, Howard Greenfield) – (2:32)
 "Sacred Heart of Stone" (King, Goffin) – (3:45)
 "Speeding Time" (King, Goffin) – (4:49)

Side 2

 "Standin' on the Borderline" (King, Goffin) – (2:55)
 "So Ready for Love" (King) – (5:22)
 "Chalice Borealis" (King, Rick Sorensen) – (2:35)
 "Dancing" (King) – (4:00)
 "Alabaster Lady" (King) – (5:45)

Personnel
 Carole King – lead vocals, backing vocals, piano, synthesizer
 Robbie Kondor – synthesizer, programming (2, 3, 5, 6, 7, 9, 10), harmonica solo (7)
 Rob Meurer – synthesizer, programming (1, 4, 8)
 Danny Kortchmar, Lee Ritenour – guitar
 Bob Glaub – bass guitar
 Steve Meador – drums (1, 4)
 Russ Kunkel – drums (2, 3, 5–10)
 Bobbye Hall – percussion
 Plas Johnson – tenor saxophone solo (3)
 Sherry Goffin Kondor – counter lead vocals (9)

Production
 Producer – Lou Adler
 Engineered and Mixed by Paul Brown at Amigo Studios (North Hollywood, CA).
 Mastered by Bobby Hata at Amigo Studios.
 Album Design – Peter Corriston
 Cover Photo – Jim Shea
 Design Photo – Brian Hagiwara

Production notes
Lou Adler – producer
Paul Brown – engineering and mixing

References

1983 albums
Carole King albums
Albums produced by Lou Adler
Atlantic Records albums